The Third Album may refer to:

The Third Album (Barbra Streisand album), 1964
The Third Album (Paul Jabara album), 1979

See also
Third Album, a 1970 album by The Jackson 5
Third Album (Shocking Blue album), 1971
Third (disambiguation)